T+E is a  Canadian English language cable television specialty channel owned by Blue Ant Media. The channel primarily broadcasts entertainment programming, including docu-series and dramas related to the supernatural and paranormal.

History
On November 24, 2000, a general partnership consisting of BCE Media Inc./Groupe TVA Inc. (owning 51%) and CTV Television Inc. (owning 49%) were granted approval by the Canadian Radio-television and Telecommunications Commission (CRTC) to launch Travel TV, described as a "national English-language Category 1 specialty television service... consisting exclusively of travel or travel-related programming. The service will explore the world within and beyond Canada’s borders. Programs will address various segments of the population and all types of travel, including those focusing on adventure, outdoor, sporting, cultural and historical interests."

The channel was launched on September 7, 2001, as CTV Travel under the sole ownership of CTV Television Inc. (parent company later became CTVglobemedia, now known today as Bell Media). Programming on the channel consisted of docu-series devoted to travel such as Jet Set, Exotic Islands, Places of Mystery, and Full Circle with Michael Palin.

On October 30, 2006, CTV Travel was renamed Travel + Escape (stylized as travel + escape until October 5, 2011) to give the channel, described by its owner, a new "edgier" look and feel to fit its new shift in programming the channel had already been making towards more character-driven and experienced-based travel series rather than the typical travelogue programs. New programs introduced to the channel included such series as Dead Famous, The Pleasure Zone, Hunt for Supertwister, The Amazing Race, and Mayhem at the Manor.

On June 8, 2010, it was announced that CTVglobemedia would be selling Travel + Escape to Glassbox Television. The sale was approved by the CRTC on October 26 and closed shortly thereafter.

On April 11, 2011, it was announced that Blue Ant Media would acquire a controlling interest in Glassbox Television. Blue Ant Media initially acquired a 29.9% stake in the company, with the option to expand their stake up to 75% which would give the company controlling interest. On October 5, 2011, Glassbox Television announced that Travel + Escape would undergo a major overhaul on November 1, 2011. The overhaul included a new logo, on-air presentation, and a slate of new programming. On December 15, 2011, Travel + Escape launched a high definition feed.

In the summer of 2012, Travel + Escape would be purchased outright by Blue Ant Media. Under their ownership, the channel would further shift its focus away from travel-based series to general-interest adventure and exploration based programming.

In March 2018, Travel + Escape was renamed T+E, as part of a full shift to supernatural and paranormal programming.

Logos

References

External links
 

Blue Ant Media channels
Digital cable television networks in Canada
Television channels and stations established in 2001
English-language television stations in Canada